Shafi Inamdar (23 October 1945 – 13 March 1996) was an Indian actor. He started his film career with the film Vijeta and continued it in Ardh Satya. He acted in a number of television serials including Yeh Jo Hai Zindagi. His most notable film roles include the inspector in Aaj Ki Awaz, the villain in Awam and the friend of the hero in films like Nazrana, Anokha Rishta, Amrit. Some of his other films are Kudrat Ka Kanoon, Jurm, Sadaa Suhagan and Love 86, all successful.

Life and career
Shafi Inamdar received his early education at Pangari Dapoli, Ratnagiri, MS and at St. Joseph's High School in Umerkhadi (Dongri) in Mumbai, India, where he passed his S.S.C exam in 1958. He did his B.Sc from K.C College in 1963.

He is particularly known for playing the common man's role. He has acted in numerous television shows, the most notable being Kundan Shah's Yeh Jo Hai Zindagi, telecast on Doordarshan in the 80s which made him a household name. The show went on to become so popular that it even started affecting the business of films, as it used to be aired late on Friday nights. The serial was such a hit that it ran for 61 episodes when generally a serial ran for a maximum of 25 weeks. One of his last performances on television was in Teri Bhi Chup Meri Bhi Chup. He also played the role of an advocate in the Hindi film Yeshwant, which was released after his death. He appeared in Ramesh Sippy's film Saagar. Inamdar also directed a film titled Hum Dono, starring Nana Patekar, Rishi Kapoor and Pooja Bhatt. The film was a hit and he was considered a good director.

From his schooling days he was interested in dramas and used to act and direct school plays. He participated in elocution competition and debates. This continued through his college days and intensified his desire to become a performing artist and a theatre personality. He started his career as an actor and director under the guidance of Gujarati theatre personality Praveen Joshi. He directed and acted in about 30 one act plays in Hindi, Gujarati, Marathi and English from 1973 to 1978. Later he joined the Indian National Theatre and Indian People's Theatre Association where he met Balraj Sahni and other members of Indian Theatre and learned the finer aspects of acting.

The turning point in his career was Ismat Chugtai’s play Nila Kamra, which he staged as his first commercial production in Hindi. In the late seventies when the Prithvi Theatre was started Shafi Inamdar got an opportunity to produce several Hindi plays that paved the way for establishing him as a theatre personality to be reckoned with. He founded his own theatre group Hum Productions in 1982 and directed, produced and acted in various plays. He also staged comedies and folk theatre based on human drama, Naag Mandala.

In 1984 came India’s most popular television sitcom Yeh Jo Hai Zindagi, a comedy serial starring Shafi Inamdar in the main lead as the character Ranjeet Verma, Swaroop Sampat played his wife Renu while Rakesh Bedi played his brother-in-law Raja. Shafi later acted in many other television serials like Adha Sach, Aadha Jooth, Mirza Ghalib and Teri Bhi Chup meri Bhi Chup. In 1983, he made first appearance on the Hindi screen in the Shashi Kapoor produced and Govind Nihalani directed film Vijeta, followed by the hard-hitting but popular Ardh Satya. He acted in B. R. Chopra films like Aaj Ki Awaaz (for which he also won a nomination in Filmfare award for Best Supporting Actor), Awaam and Dahleez, and became a regular with the B. R. film camp.

One of his most notable efforts comes from the film Krantiveer, in which he plays a TV anchor, 
a caricature of TV journalist Rajat Sharma of Aap Ki Adalat fame, and exposes a group of corrupted people regarding politics, law and police. His witty dialogues were appreciated. Krantiveer was one of the highest-grossing movies of 1994.

Personal life
Shafi married actress Bhakti Barve, who died in a road accident on 12 February 2001.

Shafi died on 13 March 1996 following a massive heart attack while watching the India vs Sri Lanka 1996 Cricket World Cup semifinal match. At the time, he was acting in the comedy show Teri Bhi Chup Meri Bhi Chup, which was shelved due to his death.

Filmography

Television

Awards and nominations
 1986: Nominated: Filmfare Award for Best Supporting Actor for Aaj Ki Awaaz

References

External links

Shafi Inamdar at IndiaFM

Indian male stage actors
Male actors in Hindi cinema
Indian male television actors
Indian male film actors
1945 births
1996 deaths
Male actors from Mumbai
20th-century Indian male actors
Gujarati theatre